BBC Select was an overnight television service run by the BBC during the hours when BBC1 or BBC2 had closed down, usually between 2am and 6am. The channel showed programming intended for specialist audiences, such as businessmen, lawyers, nurses and teachers, and was designed to be viewed after broadcast via a video recording. It was funded by a subscription, and most programming was scrambled.

History
The service was officially launched during the overnight hours of 21 January 1992, and ran on both BBC1 and 2. A spiritual predecessor of BBC Select intended for members of the British health care profession, called British Medical TV (BMTV), aired encrypted health care-related programming during the overnight hours of BBC1 and 2 between 1989 and 1992. BBC Select experimented with programming for specific audiences, and with overnight broadcasts, experience that the BBC would later use when broadcasting the BBC Learning Zone. By broadcasting the programming then, it allowed the BBC to broaden their audience, while allowing more time in the day for other programming.

The programming was specifically aimed at the professional services of business, nurses, teachers and lawyers with programming made in-house by the BBC with some programming supplied by other independent companies as part of their remit. An example of this was Thames Television whose film Living with Disabilities, and their series The Way Ahead, both made for the Department of Social Security, were distributed free, on condition that no financial gain be made from it: as a result the programme was broadcast un-encrypted.

Corporate companies also took advantage of the service. In 1992 and 1993 Cable & Wireless used BBC Select to broadcast highlights of their annual general meeting (AGM). The first broadcast, of their 1992 AGM, was the first time in the UK that a company AGM had been televised. These highlights were broadcast unencrypted.

The service was closed on 8 October 1995 with the launch of BBC Learning Zone.

BBC Selector
To watch programming, a set-top box, or BBC Selector and BBC Select viewing card was required which both decoded and unscrambled the programme. The box also received signals, sent out prior to the programme start, that would alert the box to the fact the programme was starting. The box would then trigger VCRs to begin recording by sending out a pulse of Infrared to set off the VCR's recorder, as if the viewer had pressed the record button.

The scrambling system used was called "VideoCrypt 'S'". The system was very similar to what British Sky Broadcasting were using for their analogue satellite transmissions, but was modified due to technical limitations of terrestrial TV.

Presentation
The new service had differing presentation to the BBC channels that they broadcast on. The presentation featured a single gold circle in centre screen with the BBC Select caption beneath. The 'S' in Select of the caption has a circle around it. The channel featured no announcements, promotions or captions for upcoming programming, with presentation featuring only the ident, filler and promotions of the service itself.

The ident featured the circle that began rotating, becoming a coin, City of London seal, a rotating machinery part, a retracting telescope, stage light, aeroplane Jet engine and film reel before finally becoming the circle again. The ident could also form out of the background, as the circle drew itself from the top clockwise. This was occasionally used at the startup of the service.

Because the service was designed to be played back on VCR, the breaks between programmes were deliberately long, the average gap was five minutes and gaps could easily reach ten minutes, so that programmes could be set to overrun for 5 minutes so the end would not be missed, but it would avoid disrupting recording of a subsequent programme. In these five-minute breaks, a filler was used that composed the static ring logo against a background that constantly and gradually changes colour, to an extended version of the ident music. This would then usually fade into the ident.

See also

 BBC Learning Zone

References

External links
BBC Select promos at TVARK
BBC Select promo video

Defunct BBC television channels
Educational broadcasting in the United Kingdom
Television channels and stations established in 1992
Television channels and stations disestablished in 1995
1992 establishments in the United Kingdom
1995 disestablishments in the United Kingdom